In enzymology, a carbonyl reductase (NADPH) is an enzyme that catalyzes the chemical reaction

R-CO-R' + NADPH + H+  :R-CHOH-R' + NADP+

Thus, the two products of this enzyme are R-CHOH-R' and NADP+, whereas its 3 substrates are R-CO-R', NADPH, and H+.

This enzyme belongs to the family of oxidoreductases, specifically those acting on the CH-OH group of donor with NAD+ or NADP+ as acceptor. The systematic name of this enzyme class is secondary-alcohol:NADP+ oxidoreductase. Other names in common use include aldehyde reductase 1, prostaglandin 9-ketoreductase, xenobiotic ketone reductase, NADPH-dependent carbonyl reductase, ALR3, carbonyl reductase, nonspecific NADPH-dependent carbonyl reductase, aldehyde reductase 1, and carbonyl reductase (NADPH). This enzyme participates in arachidonic acid metabolism, and has recently been shown to catabolize S-Nitrosoglutathione, as a means to degrade NO in an NADPH-dependent manner.

Structural studies

References

 
 
 

EC 1.1.1
NADPH-dependent enzymes
Enzymes of known structure